Molla Ebrahim (also Romanized as Mollā Ebrāhīm and Mulla Ibrāhīm) is a village in Naharjan Rural District, Mud District, Sarbisheh County, South Khorasan Province, Iran. At the 2006 census, its population was 12, in 4 families.

References 

Populated places in Sarbisheh County